Cyme Lulaj (born 20 October 1989) is a Kosovan-born Albanian footballer who plays as a midfielder and has appeared for the Albania women's national team.

Career
Lulaj has been capped for the Albania national team, appearing for the team during the 2019 FIFA Women's World Cup qualifying cycle.

See also
List of Albania women's international footballers

References

External links
 
 
 

1989 births
Living people
Albanian women's footballers
Women's association football midfielders
Albania women's international footballers
Sportspeople from Gjakova
Kosovan women's footballers
Kosovan people of Albanian descent
Sportspeople of Albanian descent